"Mercury Summer" is the second single from Fightstar's third studio album, Be Human. It was released on 6 April 2009.

Frontman Charlie Simpson said that the inspiration for this song came from one of his favourite movies, The Shawshank Redemption, and the dream of the lead character, Andy.

Bassist Dan Haigh has stated that the original song was meant to include a sample of Morgan Freeman's dialogue from the film- the line "I hope the sea is as blue as our dream"- but, in his words, "Hollywood screwed that up for us. We just couldn't get it cleared."

Track listing
CD:
 "Mercury Summer" (Single Edit)
 "Athea"

7" Vinyl:
 "Mercury Summer"
 "We Left Tracks of Fire"

iTunes EP Bundle :
 "Mercury Summer" (Single Edit)
 "Athea"
 "We Left Tracks of Fire"
 "Mercury Summer" (Acoustic)
 "Mercury Summer" (Nero vs. Ohms Remix)
 "Mercury Summer" (Music Video)

Music video
The video was premiered on their myspace on 25 February 2009. It features the band dressed in suits, in a spinning room, along with images of a blonde woman played by Lucy Misch (now Lucy Challenger).

Chart performance
Mercury Summer entered the UK Charts at No. 46, Fightstar's highest single position since Hazy Eyes which peaked at number 47. It also entered at No. 1 and No. 3 in the Rock Singles Chart and Independent Singles chart respectively.

References

External links
Mercury Summer video on Myspace.

2009 singles
Songs written by Charlie Simpson
Fightstar songs
Songs written by Alex Westaway
2009 songs